Abbaye de Belloc is a French Pyrenees, traditional farmhouse, semi-hard cheese from the Pays Basque region, made from unpasteurized sheep milk, with a fat content of 60%. The cheese is still made in the traditional manner by the Benedictine monks of the Abbaye Notre-Dame de Belloc, in the commune of Belloc in the Ariège department of southwestern France. Production of this Ossau-Iraty cheese is regulated by A.O.C. laws. Abbaye is produced from the milk of a centuries-old breed of red-nosed Manech ewes, particular to the Basque region, delivered by farms neighboring Belloc Abbey. It is believed that these Benedictine monks were the first to teach shepherds from the Basque region how to make cheese many centuries ago. Abbaye de Belloc has a pleasantly nutty and complex flavor that is characteristic of Basque, and is made in a 5 kg fat wheel with a natural, crusty, brownish colored rind with patches of red, orange and yellow. This semi-firm cheese has a dense, rich and creamy texture and a distinctive lanolin aroma. Careful attention under the correct maturing conditions accentuates this cheese's rich, caramelized flavors, which sometime resemble burnt caramel, that can make Abbaye de Belloc so addictive. It pairs particularly well with Pinot Noir, as it is mild enough not to overwhelm the subtleties of this delicate varietal, but also has sufficient complexity to stand up to the bolder flavors of a Syrah/Shiraz.

References

French cheeses
Sheep's-milk cheeses
Basque cuisine